Funa Yanase (born 6 June 2002) is a Japanese professional footballer who plays as a midfielder for WE League club Sanfrecce Hiroshima Regina.

Club career 
Yanase made her WE League debut on 12 September 2021.

References 

Living people
2002 births
Japanese women's footballers
Women's association football midfielders
Sanfrecce Hiroshima Regina players
WE League players
Association football people from Aichi Prefecture